Qamishan may refer to:
 Qamishan, Hamadan
 Qamishan, Isfahan

See also
 Qomishan (disambiguation)